Bailey Park is an urban park in the town of Abergavenny, in Monmouthshire Wales. It was founded in 1884 on land donated by Crawshay Bailey, Junior. The park is home to Abergavenny Rugby Football Club. In the 20th century, the park had a lido, but this was later decommissioned and demolished, although a campaigning group is working for its reinstatement. Bailey Park is registered Grade II on the Register of Parks and Gardens of Special Historic Interest in Wales. The entrance gates, gate piers, walls and railings on the Hereford Road are listed at Grade II. The park is managed by Monmouthshire County Council.

History and description
Bailey Jr. displayed no interest in his father's commercial and industrial activities, instead using his inherited wealth to set himself up as a country gentleman. Establishing his own country seat at Maindiff, outside of Abergavenny, he became a considerable benefactor to the town, while developing a large landholding around Llantilio Pertholey and indulging in country sports, particularly foxhunting.

In 1883 Bailey leased 8 hectares of land known as Priory Fields, off the Hereford Road in Abergavenny, and laid out a public park. In 1894 the park was bought by the Improvement Commissioners, predecessors of Abergavenny Town Council, using money gifted by Bailey's heirs. The park was equipped with many of the facilities common to those established in the Victorian era, including a bandstand, bowling greens and greenhouses. In 1939 a lido was constructed but this was closed in 1996 due to concerns over operating and maintenance costs. The structure was later demolished.  A campaigning group is, as of 2020, seeking to reconstruct the lido and reopen it for public use. The park is home to Abergavenny Rugby Football Club which was founded in 1875.

Bailey Park is listed at Grade II on the Register of Parks and Gardens of Special Historic Interest in Wales. The entrance gates, gate piers, walls and railings on the Hereford Road are Grade II listed structures. The park is managed by Monmouthshire County Council.

Gallery

Footnotes

References

Sources

External links
 Photograph collection compiled by the Abergavenny Lido Group
Abergavenny
Parks in Monmouthshire
Sports venues completed in 1884
Registered historic parks and gardens in Monmouthshire